Ujwala Vasudev Nikam (born 19 June 1958, in Pune, Maharashtra) is a former Test and One Day International cricketer who represented India. She also represented Maharashtra women's cricket team in the domestic league. She played eight Test matches and two One Day Internationals.
 
Ujwala was born in a middle-class family. Her father was a police inspector in  the city of Pune. She attended Modern High School in that city.

References

1958 births
Living people
Cricketers from Pune
Indian women cricketers
Maharashtra women cricketers
India women One Day International cricketers
India women Test cricketers
Sportswomen from Maharashtra